Jorge Maximiliano Piris (born 22 July 1990) is an Argentine footballer.

He played for Cobreloa in 2015.

References
 
 

1990 births
Living people
Argentine footballers
Argentine expatriate footballers
Chacarita Juniors footballers
Club Deportivo Palestino footballers
Chilean Primera División players
Expatriate footballers in Chile
Association football forwards
Footballers from Buenos Aires